Trudy is a feminine given name.

Trudy may also refer to:

 Trudy (comic strip), an American comic strip by Jerry Marcus
 Trudy (gorilla) (1957–2019), considered the oldest living gorilla, held in Little Rock, Arkansas, U.S.
 The Trudy, an English post-punk band
 22900 Trudie, an asteroid
 "Trudy", a song by the Charlie Daniels Band from Fire on the Mountain (1974)